The 1970 Giro d'Italia was the 53rd edition of the Giro d'Italia, one of cycling's Grand Tours. The field consisted of 130 riders, and 97 riders finished the race.

By rider

By nationality

References

1970 Giro d'Italia
1970